Joscelyne "Josie" Dye (born April 5, 1978) is a Canadian radio and television personality, currently the morning host on CIND-FM (Indie88) in Toronto, Ontario. Prior to joining Indie88, she was a personality on CFNY-FM (102.1 The Edge) in the same market, and worked in television at Corus Entertainment for both W and CMT Canada.

Her first professional role was Amaryllis in Limelight Theater's production of The Music Man at age 9 and she played an orphan at Young People’s Theatre in Jacob Two Two.

Background

Raised in Pickering, she attended Ryerson University from 1998 to 2001, graduating from the Radio and Television Arts Program. She was married on July 24, 2010 to Dine Alone Records founder Joel Carriere.

Career
Dye currently hosts The Josie Dye Show on Indie88, and has hosted Oh So Cosmo on Cosmopolitan TV and Hit or Miss on CMT Canada.

Dye has also hosted the Cutting Edge Music Festival, Wakestock, Edgefest, and the CASBY Awards. An avid runner, she has endorsed Nike and Apple since 2006.  She has been involved with the Easter Seals charity since 2002, hosting and attending many of their events.

Dye is a prolific public speaker, giving career, motivational and educational speeches to high school and 
university students as well as to women's groups, Toastmasters International and the workplace.

Siblings
Dye has a sister who is a teacher in the Toronto District School Board, her name is Alison dye. She teaches music arts and band at a high school.

References

External links
 Josie Dye Show from Indie 88 website
 

1978 births
Canadian television hosts
Toronto Metropolitan University alumni
Living people
People from Pickering, Ontario
Canadian radio hosts
Canadian women radio hosts
Canadian women television hosts